The first season of the American television drama series Homeland premiered on October 2, 2011, on Showtime and concluded on December 18, 2011, consisting of 12 episodes. The series is loosely based on the Israeli television series Hatufim (English: Prisoners of War) created by Gideon Raff and is developed for American television by Howard Gordon and Alex Gansa. The first season follows Carrie Mathison, a CIA operations officer who has come to believe that Nicholas Brody, a U.S. Marine Sergeant, who was held captive by al-Qaeda as a prisoner of war, was turned by the enemy and now poses a significant risk to national security.

The season received universal acclaim, scoring a Metacritic rating of 92 out of 100 from 28 critics. TV Guide named it the best TV show of 2011 and highly applauded the performances by Damian Lewis and Claire Danes. Metacritic determined Homeland to be the second-best TV show of 2011 according to major TV critics, by aggregating the critics' year-end top ten lists. The series won both the Golden Globe Award for Best Television Series – Drama and the Primetime Emmy Award for Outstanding Drama Series for this season.

The original broadcast of the pilot episode on October 2, 2011, received 1.08 million viewers, becoming Showtime's highest-rated drama premiere in eight years. The episode received a total of 2.78 million viewers with additional broadcasts and on demand views. The finale episode of season one received 1.7 million viewers, making it the most-watched season finale of any first-year Showtime series. The series also performed well in the UK, where it aired on Channel 4, with the pilot episode drawing 3.10 million viewers, and the finale drawing 4.01 million viewers.

Cast

Main

 Claire Danes as Carrie Mathison, a CIA operations officer assigned to the Counterterrorism Center
 Damian Lewis as Nicholas Brody, a U.S. Marine sergeant who was rescued by Delta Force after being held by al-Qaeda as a prisoner of war for eight years
 Morena Baccarin as Jessica Brody, Nicholas Brody's wife
 David Harewood as David Estes, the Director of the CIA's Counterterrorism Center and Carrie's boss
 Diego Klattenhoff as Mike Faber, a U.S. Marine Captain. He was Nicholas' best friend who, assuming he was dead, started having an affair with Jessica Brody.
 Jackson Pace as Chris Brody, Nicholas Brody's son
 Morgan Saylor as Dana Brody, Nicholas Brody's daughter
 Mandy Patinkin as Saul Berenson, the CIA's Middle-East Division Chief and Carrie's old boss and mentor

Recurring
 Jamey Sheridan as William Walden, Vice President of the United States and former director of the CIA
 Navid Negahban as Abu Nazir, a high-ranking member of al-Qaeda
 David Marciano as Virgil Piotrowski, Carrie's contact aiding in the surveillance of Brody
 Maury Sterling as Max Piotrowski, Virgil's brother who also aids in the surveillance of Brody
 Afton Williamson as Helen Walker, Tom Walker's wife
 Amy Hargreaves as Maggie Mathison, Carrie's older sister and a psychiatrist
 Alok Tewari as Latif Bin Walid
 Omid Abtahi as Raqim Faisel, Aileen's husband who is also part of a sleeper cell
 Marin Ireland as Aileen Morgan, an anti-American terrorist part of a sleeper cell
 Hrach Titizian as Danny Galvez, a CIA agent of Guatemalan and Lebanese origin
 Sarita Choudhury as Mira Berenson, Saul's wife who is often out of the country
 Chris Chalk as Tom Walker, a U.S. Marine who was captured along with Brody
 Ramsey Faragallah as Mansour Al-Zahrani

Guest

 Nestor Serrano as Major General Tony Trujillo
 Scott Bryce as Major Foster
 Amir Arison as Prince Farid Bin Abbud
 Brianna Brown as Lynne Reed, a CIA informant
 Melissa Benoist as Stacy Moore
 Michael McKean as Judge Jeffrey Turner
 Lawrence O'Donnell as himself
 Gaby Hoffmann as a CNN producer
 Annika Boras as Jessica's friend
 James Rebhorn as Frank Mathison, Carrie's father
 Waleed Zuaiter as Afsal Hamid
 James Urbaniak as Larry
 Sherman Howard as Chip Shooter Haigh
 Marc Menchaca as Lauder Wakefield, a former Marine
 Reggie Austin as Matt
 Jaden Harmon as Lucas Walker
 Linda Purl as Elizabeth Gaines, the Vice President's chief advisor
 Sammy Sheik as Imam Rafan Gohar
 Billy Smith as Special Agent Hall
 Rohan Chand as Issa Nazir
 Trent Dawson as Kyle Galyean
 Remy Auberjonois as William Pritchar
 Nasser Faris as Bassel "The Tailor"
 Charles Borland as Sanders
 Elizabeth Franz as Isabel Samler
 Larry Pine as Richard Halsted

Episodes

Plot
The first season follows Carrie Mathison, a Central Intelligence Agency operations officer who, after conducting an unauthorized operation in Iraq, is put on probation and reassigned to the CIA's Counterterrorism Center in Langley, Virginia. In Iraq, Carrie was warned by an asset that an American prisoner of war had been turned by al-Qaeda. Carrie has also been diagnosed with bipolar disorder, a fact that she conceals from the CIA. She surreptitiously receives medication for the disorder from her sister.

Carrie's job grows complicated when her boss, Director of the Counterterrorism Center David Estes, calls Carrie and her colleagues in for an emergency briefing. Carrie learns that Nicholas Brody, a U.S. Marine Sergeant who had been reported as missing in action since 2003, has been rescued during a Delta Force raid on a compound belonging to terrorist Abu Nazir. Carrie comes to believe that Brody is the American prisoner of war whom her asset in Iraq was talking about. However, the federal government and her superiors at the CIA consider Brody a war hero. Later, another Marine captured at the same time, Tom Walker, is also found to be still alive, casting doubt on which of the Marines is the suspected spy.

Realizing it would be nearly impossible to convince her boss to place Brody under surveillance, Carrie approaches the only other person she can trust, her mentor, Saul Berenson. The two must now work together to investigate Brody and prevent another terrorist attack on American soil. Eventually, Brody plans to assassinate the Vice President with a suicide vest but falters at the last moment after an emotional conversation with his daughter Dana. Carrie becomes more paranoid that Brody plans to carry out a terroristic act.

Reception
On Rotten Tomatoes, the season has an approval rating of 100% with an average score of 9.3 out of 10 based on 31 reviews. The website's critical consensus reads, "Homeland is an addictive, politically resonant spy thriller and compelling character study that benefits from superb performances." The first season scored a Metacritic rating of 92 out of 100 from 28 critics. TV Guide named it the best TV show of 2011 and highly applauded the performances by Damian Lewis and Claire Danes. Metacritic determined Homeland to be the second-best TV show of 2011 according to major TV critics, by aggregating the critics' year-end top-ten lists. 

Hank Stuever of The Washington Post gave the pilot episode an A−, saying "What makes Homeland rise above other post-9/11 dramas is Danes's stellar performance as Carrie — easily this season's strongest female character," and that "The latter half of the first episode is exhilarating. I'm hooked." Matthew Gilbert of The Boston Globe said it was his favorite drama pilot of the season, giving it an A. Entertainment Weeklys Ken Tucker gave it an A−, stating "It's the fall season's most intriguing, tense puzzler." IGN TV gave it a positive review, saying that it was an "ace thriller" that also managed to have something to say about the "War on Terror". The seventh episode, "The Weekend", was described by both the creators of the show and Damian Lewis as a "watershed" episode. 

Former US President Barack Obama has praised the show.

Home media release 
Homeland: The Complete First Season was released as a widescreen region 1 four-disc DVD and three-disc Blu-ray box set in the United States and Canada on August 28, 2012.  In addition to all 12 episodes that had aired, it includes audio commentary on the pilot episode, deleted scenes, "Homeland Season One: Under Surveillance" featurette, and "Week Ten: A Prologue to Season 2" featurette. The same set was also released on September 10, 2012, in region 2.

The season is also available for streaming online via Hulu, as of August 1, 2016.

References

External links 
 
 

1
2011 American television seasons